The Joint Light Tactical Vehicle (JLTV) is a U.S. Army, U.S. Marine Corps and Special Operations Command program to partially replace the Humvee fleet with a family of more survivable vehicles having a greater payload. Early studies for the JLTV program were approved in 2006.  The JLTV program incorporates lessons learned from the earlier Future Tactical Truck Systems program and other associated efforts.

The JLTV program has evolved considerably throughout various development phases and milestones including required numbers and pricing. Variants are capable of performing armament carrier, utility, command and control (shelter), ambulance, reconnaissance and a variety of other tactical and logistic support roles. JLTV follows the U.S. Army's Long Term Armor Strategy with kits for two levels of armor protection. Oshkosh's L-ATV was selected as the winner of the JLTV program in August 2015 and awarded an initial production contract for up to 16,901 JLTVs. The U.S. Army approved the JLTV for full-rate production in June 2019.

Development
The High Mobility Multipurpose Wheeled Vehicle (HMMWV), which first entered service in 1985, was developed during the Cold War when improvised explosive devices (IEDs) and asymmetric warfare were not a major factor for military planners. The HMMWVs demonstrated vulnerability to IEDs, and the difficulties and costs experienced in satisfactorily up-armoring HMMWVs led to the development of a family of more survivable vehicles with greater payload and mobility. JLTV was originally reported as a one-for-one HMMWV replacement; however, U.S. Department of Defense (DoD) officials now emphasize that JLTVs are not intended to replace all HMMWVs.

The JLTV publicly emerged in 2006. Early government documents note: "In response to an operational need and an aging fleet of light tactical wheeled vehicles, the joint services have developed a requirement for a new tactical wheeled vehicle platform that will provide increased force protection, survivability, and improved capacity over the current [Up-armored Humvee] while balancing mobility and transportability requirements with total ownership costs." The joint service nature of the effort was assured through Congressional language in the Fiscal Year 2006 (FY06) Authorization Act, which mandated that any future tactical wheeled vehicle program would be a joint program.

The Joint Chief of Staff's Joint Requirements Oversight Council approved the JLTV program in November 2006; this began a 13-month Concept Refinement phase which is a pre-systems acquisition process designed to further develop the initial concepts resident in the Initial Capabilities Document. The Concept Refinement phase also includes an Analysis of Alternatives. At the conclusion of the Concept Refinement phase in December 2007, the Joint Program Office JLTV project manager intended to transition the program directly into the engineering, manufacturing, and development phase. However, as milestone approached, it became clear that the Under Secretary of Defense for Acquisition and Sustainment John Young would not support the JLTV program entering into the acquisition process at that time. He denied the request and instructed the Army and the Marine Corps to develop a more vigorous Technology Development (TD) phase.

The DoD released a Request for Proposal (RFP) for the TD phase of the JLTV program on 5 February 2008. Industry proposals were due 7 April. TD phase contract award was postponed in July 2008. The following companies and partnerships responded to the TD phase RFP:
 Boeing, Textron and Millenworks
 General Dynamics and AM General (as "General Tactical Vehicles")
 Force Protection Inc and DRS Technologies (officially rejected on 14 August 2008)
 BAE Systems and Navistar
 Northrop Grumman, Oshkosh Truck and Plasan
 Lockheed Martin, BAE Systems Land & Armaments Global Tactical Systems, Alcoa Defense and JWF Industries
 Blackwater and Raytheon

On 28 October 2008, the Pentagon narrowed the field of vendors to Lockheed Martin, General Tactical Vehicles and BAE Systems/Navistar. Each team was awarded contracts worth between $35.9 million and $45 million to begin the next phase of the program, which at the time was stated to be worth $20 billion or more. The Northrop Grumman/Oshkosh group contested the awards, but their protest was denied by the Government Accountability Office. On 1 June 2010, it was confirmed that all three contractors had delivered seven JLTV platforms for TD phase evaluation. The U.S. Army appeared to have reduced its support for the program at this time, omitting JLTV numbers from its tactical vehicle strategy published in June 2010. However, the U.S. Army clarified that JLTVs are slated to both replace and complement the Humvee.

JLTV's TD phase was completed in May 2011. In February 2011, the JLTV Program Office announced the award of the follow-on Engineering and Manufacturing Development phase contract would be delayed until January or February 2012 because the Army changed requirements for the JLTV, requiring it to have the same level of under body protection as the Mine-Resistant, Ambush-Protected All-Terrain Vehicle (M-ATV). Updated specifications for the program included reducing the payload options to the Combat Tactical Vehicle (CTV) configuration, which would be a 4-seat vehicle with a 3,500 pound payload, and the Combat Support Vehicle (CSV), which would be a 2-seat vehicle with a 5,100 pound payload.

Engineering and Manufacturing Development phase
The draft RFP for the Engineering and Manufacturing Development (EMD) phase was released on 2 October 2011. This called for an average unit manufacturing cost between $230,000 and $270,000 across the JLTV family of vehicles. The cost target for the B-kit armor package remains at US$65,000. EMD phase requirements also created some trade space for industry by easing weight and mobility constraints.  At this time JLTV was in danger of severe budget cuts and possible cancellation in the wake of spiraling costs, delays, and defense-wide budgetary cutbacks; it was also competing against the HMMWV Modernized Expanded Capacity Vehicle (MECV) program, the draft RFP for which was released on 11 August 2011.

On 26 January 2012 the Request for Proposals for JLTV's EMD phase was released. Budget priorities for FY13 released on the same day included the termination of the HMMWV MECV program in order to focus vehicle modernization resources on JLTV. Not all of the TD phase contract award teams remained in place for the EMD phase. By late March 2012, at least six teams had submitted responses to the EMD phase RFP, and following EMD phase contract awards on 23 August 2012, in September Hardwire LLC disclosed itself as a previously unknown seventh bidder. The bidders were:
 AM General (still at the time teamed with GTV for a separate offering) offered the Blast-Resistant Vehicle – Off Road (BRV-O), a product based on its own R&D, and a design that leveraged some of AM General's then recent experience with HMMWV MECV designs.
 BAE Systems (previously teamed with Navistar) realigned its team for the EMD phase to include Ford (Ford Motor Company's Power Stroke 6.7 liter turbocharged diesel engine; Ford had been considering participating in the JLTV's EMD competition with its own offering) and proposed a design that capitalized on earlier TD phase work with the Valanx.
 GTV dropped its TD phase developed design and opted to offer a lowest risk solution, a further development of the in-production MOWAG Eagle.
 Lockheed Martin opted to stay with its TD phase offering, albeit a version that according to the company was "hundreds of pounds lighter in weight."
 Navistar, which broke away from BAE Systems for the EMD phase, offered a variant of its Saratoga light tactical vehicle, this unveiled in October 2011 as a middle-ground offering between the HMMWV and JLTV, the latter with its then current TD phase spec still technically in place.
 Oshkosh proposed a variant of the company's L-ATV, unveiled in October 2011. L-ATV has developmental origins that trace back to Oshkosh/Northrop-Grumman's failed initial JLTV proposal.
 Hardwire offered a proposal featuring a hybrid-electric drive train. Hardwire's armor has been employed on MRAP vehicles, and the company is known for developing a "blast chimney" that it designed to provide an outlet for energy released in an underbelly blast.
On 23 August 2012, the Army and Marine Corps selected the Lockheed Martin JLTV, the Oshkosh L-ATV, and the AM General BRV-O as the winners of the EMD phase of the competition.  The three companies were awarded a contract to build 22 prototype vehicles in 27 months to be judged by the services. Losing bidder Navistar filed a protest with the Government Accountability Office over the evaluation criteria on 31 August 2012; the company withdrew the protest on 4 September 2012.

On 27 August 2013, the Army and Marine Corps announced that full-scale testing of JLTV prototypes would begin the following week. Each company delivered 22 vehicles and six trailers to Aberdeen Proving Ground, Maryland, and Yuma Proving Ground, Arizona.  Previous testing had already put the vehicles through more than 400 ballistic and blast tests on armor testing samples, underbody blast testing, and more than 1,000 miles in shakedown testing.  Soldiers from the Army Test and Evaluation Command and personnel from the Defense Department's Office of Test and Evaluation put the vehicles through realistic and rigorous field testing during 14 months of government performance testing.  Testing was to be completed by FY 2015, with a production contract to be awarded to a single vendor for nearly 55,000 vehicles. On 3 September 2013, full-pace, full-scope JLTV testing began at Aberdeen Proving Ground, Yuma Proving Ground, and Redstone Arsenal, Alabama.

On 1 October 2013, the Defense Department Inspector General launched a year-long audit of the JLTV program. It was one of about a dozen acquisition programs outlined in the FY 2014 "audit plan".  The audit was to determine whether Army and Marine Corps officials were overseeing and managing the program effectively before low-rate production began.  A June 2013 report by the Congressional Research Service estimates the program cost at $23 billion, or $400,000 per vehicle; military leaders contend the unit cost at $250,000. The Army planned to issue a RFP to companies interested in bidding for production contracts in mid-November 2014 and to pick a winner possibly by July 2015. Discrepancies in unit cost have been attributed to different methods for analyzing cost.  The Inspector General report concludes program officials "appropriately assessed the affordability" of the effort, and that average unit production cost remains stable at $250,000. All three vehicles completed limited user testing and production readiness reviews by mid-November 2014.

The Army released the final JLTV RFP for low rate initial production (LRIP) and full rate production (FRP) on 12 December 2014, clearing the way for AM General, Lockheed Martin, and Oshkosh Defense to submit their vehicle proposals. The Army gave competitors until 10 February 2015, to refine and submit their bids. The Army, on behalf of itself and the Marines, stated plans to select a winner and issue a single contract award in the late summer of 2015. The winning contractor would build approximately 17,000 JLTVs for the Army and Marine Corps during three years of LRIP, followed by five years of FRP. The first Army unit would be equipped with JLTVs in FY 2018, and the Army's complete acquisition of 49,099 JLTVs would be completed in 2040, with 2,200 JLTVs delivered each year between 2020 and 2036. The Marine Corps would begin acquiring their 5,500 JLTVs at the beginning of production and would be completed by FY 2022. FY 2015 budget requests included 176 JLTV for the Army and 7 JLTV for the Marine Corps in various configurations. The total procurement cost of the JLTV program was quoted as US$30.04 billion and US$0.98 billion in research and development funds, giving a total estimated program cost of US$31.03 billion (figures are aggregated annual funds spent over the life of the program with no price/inflation adjustment).

Contract award
Oshkosh was selected for production on 25 August 2015. The award included a base contract and eight option years covering two years of LRIP (revised from three) and five years of FRP. The initial contract award was valued at US$114 million, with LRIP slated to begin in the first quarter of FY 2016, and with Oshkosh commencing delivery of vehicles approximately 10 months after contract award. The JLTV contract award had a value of up to US$6.749 billion and called for a maximum of 16,901 JLTVs and includes a sustainment element. JLTV manufacturing is performed in Oshkosh, Wisconsin. Around contract award, Oshkosh CEO Charles Szews said the production contract award would involve more than 300 suppliers in 31 states across the country.

On 8 September 2015, it was reported that Lockheed Martin would protest the award; on the same day it was also disclosed that AM General had decided not to file a protest. Any work that would be performed under the contract stopped during the review period. On 15 December 2015 the Government Accountability Office (GAO) dismissed Lockheed Martin's protest because the company on 11 December 2015 decided to file a "Notice of Post-Award Bid Protest" with the U.S. Court of Federal Claims; according to a source with knowledge of the procedures, it is uncommon for a company to file with the court close to a GAO protest decision. Immediately after the GAO dismissed the protest, the Army instructed Oshkosh to resume work on the JLTV order. Lockheed Martin filed a preliminary injunction on 17 December, stating that new Army-supplied information related to the contract emerged toward the end of the GAO's protest process that was not considered before their ruling and no deadline extension was granted. The U.S. Court of Federal Claims denied Lockheed Martin's request to stop work while the lawsuit was pending, allowing Oshkosh to continue work during the process. The company withdrew its protest in the Court of Federal Claims on 17 February 2016.

Around the time Lockheed Martin withdrew its protest some potentially crucial data from JLTV testing was revealed. The 472–page annual report from the Pentagon's independent Director of Operational Test and Evaluation revealed that in testing Oshkosh's JLTV prototype lasted nearly six times longer between significant breakdown than the next closest, Lockheed Martin's prototype. The Oshkosh vehicle achieved 7,051 mean miles between operational mission failure (MMBOMF); Lockheed Martin's vehicle achieved 1,271 MMBOMF. AM General's vehicle achieved just 526 MMBOMF. The target for JLTV is 2400 MMBOMF, the current up-armored HMMWV achieving 2,968 MMBOMF. Information on protection levels was also released. It was found in testing that both Oshkosh and Lockheed prototypes met all threshold force protection requirements and some objective-level requirements. This level of protection is better than that of up-armored HMMWVs, and similar to MRAP (Mine Resistant Ambush Protected) All-Terrain Vehicles without the underbody improvement kit across all spectrum of tested threats. AM General's prototype would need a significant redesign to meet threshold protection requirements. More details on vehicle protection were included in a classified report.

In the Pentagon's FY 2017 budget, it requested US$587.5 million to procure 1,828 JLTVs for the Army and US$113.2 million to procure 192 for the Marines. About US$34.7 million was requested for research and development between the Army and Marines' JLTV programs. Procurement objectives at this time remained 49,099 JLTV for the Army and 5,500 for the Marines.

In March 2022, a competitive rebuy for the JLTV was in progress. The final Request for Proposal (RFP) for this issued on 9 February 2022 with a contract award expected in September 2022. In February 2023, AM General won a competition to manufacture the JLTV.

Production and deliveries
The first delivery order for JLTV was announced on 23 March 2016 with the U.S. Army ordering 657 JLTVs, along with kits and support. The $243 million order included vehicles for the Army and Marines. According to Oshkosh, "The vehicles, trailers, and installed kits for this order will be delivered by first quarter FY2018." As part of the original JLTV base award in August 2015, an initial 201 JLTVs for the test and evaluation phase were ordered. The 657-vehicle order is an exercised option from the program's eight option years. Initial USMC operating capability was stated to be delayed by about one year to the first quarter of FY2020, with procurement by the Marines complete by FY2022.

In March 2016, the Pentagon announced that the total program costs had dropped 19.32%, from $30.574 billion to $24.668 billion "due primarily to revised estimates for unit costs of vehicles and kits based on realized savings", which accounted for a $3.7 billion decrease. A stretched out procurement "due to budget adjustments and revised assumptions regarding the maximum buy profile year" decreased costs by $1.28 billion, and several other changes – such as for cost estimation methodologies and indices – accounted for another $921 million decrease. The total cost estimates include "research and development, procurement, military construction, and acquisition-related operations and maintenance" associated with a program, the Pentagon said. These reflect actual costs so far and anticipated costs in the future, with all estimates in fully inflated then-year dollars. Scott Davis, program executive officer for Combat Support & Combat Service Support, stated that overall the JLTV program expects to cut about five years off of the total program and save about US$5.9 billion, as Oshkosh's final competitive bid was low enough so the Army decided to 'buy to budget' and get more platforms each year, which shrunk the total length of the contract and increased cost avoidances accrued each year.

The U.S. Army disclosed that the JLTV was to be used as the platform for the upcoming Light Reconnaissance Vehicle (LRV) program rather than procuring a new system. The LRV is to be an off-road platform for carrying a suite of intelligence, surveillance, and reconnaissance sensors; it is to be light enough to be carried by a CH-47 Chinook helicopter. The JLTV was described as an "interim LRV solution". It was also reported that the JLTV-RV (JLTV - Reconnaissance Vehicle) was to be incorporated into the JLTV technical data package and would be a kit option on future contracts. By Q4 2020 the LRV requirement had evolved to such an extent that it excluded the JLTV, requiring a six-person crew.

The Army received its first seven JLTVs for test at the end of September 2016. According to the Army, its first unit to receive JLTVs was to be an Infantry Brigade Combat Team in the 10th Mountain Division at Fort Drum, New York. The bulk of their 500 HMMWVs were to be replaced by early 2019. According to the Marine Corps, an infantry battalion within II MEF at Camp Lejeune, North Carolina, were to receive 69 JLTVs to replace the same number of Humvees in July 2019. The Marine Corps revealed they wished to adjust their acquisition objective for JLTV by 65% to up to 9,091 vehicles. At this time overall JLTV requirements remained at 5,500 for the USMC and 49,099 for the army.

In January 2017, the U.S. Air Force announced it was considering acquiring JLTVs for its security forces that protect missile launch facilities. The vehicles are used by security forces, explosive ordnance disposal teams, para-rescue and personnel recovery units, tactical air control party teams, and special tactics forces. At this time, released documents revealed no further planned JLTV procurement for the period FY 2019–22, but the service was known to want to replace its entire fleet of 3,270 HMMWVs with JLTVs. In its 2018 budget the Pentagon requested $1.143 billion for the program. The DoD requested 2,110 JLTVs for the Army, 140 for the Air Force, and 527 for the Marines.

At AUSA 2016, Oshkosh displayed a JLTV General Purpose variant equipped with an EOS R-400S-MK2 remote weapon system integrated with Orbital ATK's M230 LF 30 mm lightweight automatic chain gun. At AUSA 2017 JLTVs were displayed in three new configurations. Oshkosh displayed a general purpose variant fitted with a Boeing compact laser weapon system, a Kongsberg Protector LW 30 remote weapon system with a M230LF cannon, and a communications suite that includes a Thales VRC-111 and Thales VRC-121 VIPER. The company also displayed a utility variant equipped with the Boeing Maneuver short range air defense launcher including a M3P .50 cal machine gun, M299 launcher with four Longbow Hellfire missiles, sensor suite, and a communications suite including a Thales VRC-111. Rafael displayed a general purpose vehicle fitted with the company's Samson dual stabilized remote weapon system with M230 LF, and the Trophy Light active protection system.

Following an announcement in December 2018 that a total of 500 JLTVs would be delivered by the end of March 2019, JLTV deliveries to the Army commenced the week of 7 January 2019. The first unit to receive JLTVs was the 1st Armored Brigade Combat Team, 3rd Infantry Division at Fort Stewart. To coincide with the first fielding Oshkosh confirmed that over 3,000 JLTVs had been delivered to the Army and Marine Corps. In January 2019, the Army Reserve announced it was set to acquire 60 JLTVs for training in preparation for fielding to the entire force. No date for actual fielding was given. On 20 June 2019, Dr. Bruce Jette, Assistant Secretary of the Army for Acquisition, Logistics and Technology, approved the JLTV program's transition into full-rate production (FRP).

In July 2019 an initial Sources Sought notice (W56HZV19R0242) was issued for the A2 JLTV recompete program. Four draft Request For Proposals (RFPs) followed, these on 03 April 2020, 11 December 2020, 30 April 2021, and 29 October 2021.

The Marine Corps declared initial operational capability for the JLTV on 2 August 2019, ahead of the scheduled June 2020 date.The Marines had previously announced on 28 January 2019 that its first JLTV had fielded that day at the School of Infantry West at Camp Pendleton, California, with around 1,000 further JLTVs scheduled to be fielded during FY2020.

For FY 2020 (1 October 2019 - 30 September 2020) the Pentagon's JLTV funding request totaled US$1.641 billion to procure 2,530 vehicles for the Army, 1,398 for the Marine Corps (with 3,986 more between FY2021 and FY2024), 140 for the Air Force, and 22 for the Navy. Other FY 2020 budget activities included US$4.8 million for engineering and manufacturing development. In March 2019, it was reported that Army's FY2020 budget request included proposed cuts to pay for modernization priorities, with one of those proposed cuts being the JLTV. It was reported that over the coming five years the service would spend US$800 million less on the JLTV program than initially expected; this potentially resulting in the purchase of 1,900 fewer vehicles. As of May 2019, the service had not changed its approved acquisition objective of 49,099 JLTVs.

On 1 July 2020, Oshkosh stated that over 7,500 JLTVs had been delivered to the U.S. Army, U.S. Marine Corps, U.S. Air Force, and U.S. Navy since the production contract was awarded in 2015. This order brought the total of JLTVs ordered for US forces to date to 15,052.

In September 2020 a Justification and Approval (J&A) for up to an additional 6,262 JLTVs sole source from Oshkosh was granted, the original notice (W56HZV-15-C-0095-P00282) published on 30 June 2020. This award will enable continued JLTV production, industry arguing successfully that it required up to 33 months with the JLTV TDP package to be able to respond to the A2 JLTV RfP. The up to 6,262 JLTVs approved will technically be delivered under a separate second JLTV contract, but the original contract costings and timelines and remain. Final orders must be placed in November 2023, with deliveries permitted until late 2025, but expected to conclude mid-2025. Permissible total orders under the original JLTV award were 16,901 JLTVs.

When the U.S. Army unveiled its fiscal year 2021 (FY 2021) budget request in February 2020, supporting budget documents detailed plans for the "competitive follow on contract [JLTV] award" in FY 2022. It was disclosed that the service wants to reduce its JLTV buy by US$201.6 million over the coming years, but retaining a 40,099 procurement objective. Two years of JLTV production cuts, in FY 2020 and FY 2021, will now extend the full operational capability timeline out by three years until FY 2042. On 17 June 2020, Oshkosh announced the company had been awarded a $61.8M contract modification to increase available trailer options under the current JLTV Family of Vehicles contract from 32 to 3,541. The JLTV-T (JLTV - Trailer) was designed as an integral part of the JLTV Family of Vehicles.

In February 2021 Oshkosh announced the company had produced its 10,000th JLTV, and had received orders for 18,126 JLTVs in contracts totalling more than USD6 billion. The first National Guard fielding of JLTV was the 19th SF in 3QFY21.

On 26 January 2022 a Presolicitation Notice (W56HZV-20-R-0072) was issued for the Joint Light Tactical Vehicle (JLTV) Family of Vehicles (FoV) Follow-On, the A2 contract. The anticipated solicitation release date was 04 February 2022 with an anticipated proposal due date of 12 April 2022; actual release date was 09 Feb. The planned period of performance for this contract is from September 2022 through September 2032. The awarded contract will be a single award, five-year requirements type contract, with five one-year options on a Cost-Plus Fixed-Fee and Firm-Fixed Price basis. The projected contract value is $7.3 billion with original contract award pricing retained (plus inflation), and the award is expected to call for a maximum of 15,425 A2 JLTV and 6,000 JLTV Trailers, with deliveries to commence 18 months after contract award. In addition to Oshkosh, respondents to the RfP are expected to include AM General, GM Defense, and Navistar.

As of April 2022, 15 JLTV delivery orders had been placed, the most recent of these in November 2021 and valued at USD591 million. The order includes 1,669 vehicles and 868 trailers, the vehicle total including 125 JLTVs for Brazil, Lithuania, Montenegro, and Slovenia. Deliveries are expected to be completed by September 2023. This latest order brings the total number of JLTVs ordered to date to 19,727.

In summary, known JLTV delivery orders for U.S. armed forces to date have been:
 August 2015: 201 as part of the original JLTV base award and for the test and evaluation phase
 March 2016: 657; value $243 million
 September 2016: 130; value $42 million
 January 2017: 409; value $179 million
 August 2017: 748; value $195 million
 September 2017: 611; value $177 million
 December 2017: 258; value $100.1 million
 February 2018: 416; value $106 million
 June 2018: 1,574; value $484 million
 November 2018: 6,107; value $1.69 billion
 December 2019: 2,721; value $803.9 million
 February 2020: 1,240; value $407.3 million (includes unspecified quantities for Slovenia and Lithuania as FMS)
 July 2020: 248; value $127 million
 November 2020: 2,679; value $884.4 million (brought the total of JLTVs ordered for U.S. forces to date to 17,731, and was technically the first order under the second contract. Also included were 59 JLTVs valued at USD23 for Brazil, Lithuania, and Macedonia, making the overall total 2,738 JLTVs)
 November 2021: 1,544; value including FMS is $591 million
(all orders include unspecified quantities of training, support, kits and/or trailers)

Other operators
Outside of the United States, a number of other countries have shown an interest in or have ordered the JLTV. These include Belgium, Brazil, Lithuania, North Macedonia, Montenegro, Romania and Slovenia. All have ordered via FMS with the exception of Belgium which is a direct sale. Portugal and the United Kingdom have expressed an interest in acquiring the JLTV. Australia joined the TD phase of JLTV but ultimately opted to procure the locally produced Thales Hawkei. India expressed an interest in joining the JLTV program, but did not join.

Technical description
Given the competitive nature of the JLTV competition and recompete, only limited technical detail has been released by either the U.S. Army or Oshkosh. Only basic outline dimensions and limited operating weight and automotive data is available, and is included in Specifications. The JLTV is based around Oshkosh's TAK-4i (i=intelligent) independent suspension system. Around 26,000 military vehicles are fitted with an earlier version of the system, including the Oshkosh Medium Tactical Vehicle Replacement (MTVR), Oshkosh Logistic Vehicle System Replacement (LVSR), and Oshkosh MRAP All-Terrain Vehicle (M-ATV); the TAK-4 system has been retro-fitted to the Force Protection Inc Cougar and BAE Systems RG-33 MRAPs. The majority of systems supplied to date have been coil-sprung. The JLTVs suspension aided egress system capability levels side to side and front to rear on slopes or grades when selected by the operator. The front and rear suspension height can also be independently controlled for ship and transportability. The suspension system has ride height control at all four wheels.

Motive power is provided by a digitally-controlled Gale Banks Engineering 866T V-8 diesel, this based on the architecture of the General Motors Duramax LML. Power output is 340 hp. Production of the Duramax LML engine concluded in 2017, the unit replaced by the Duramax L5P. JLTV A1 models that were introduced in 2017 are powered by a derivation of this engine. The A2 JLTV will be powered by the next generation of the Duramax engine, production of the current Duramax MY2020 L5P scheduled to conclude Q3FY22. An Allison 2500SP six-speed fully automatic transmission is fitted to all JLTVs

The JLTV has been designed to comply with the U.S. Army's Long Term Armor Strategy (LTAS). The LTAS system follows an A-kit/B-kit principle, with vehicles designed "fitted for, but not with" protection. Protection kits can be installed and uninstalled from vehicles in the field using basic tools. The A-kit is fitted on the production line and is a combination of a limited amount of armoring, in difficult-to-access areas of the vehicle, together with a significant amount of armor installation attachments and required support structures. The bulk of the armor, the B-kit, is installed in the field on an as-required basis. Two soldiers can install B-kit armor in five hours. An 800-pound RPG protection kit can be installed in two hours at field-level maintenance and completed by the crew within 30 minutes. The JLTV offers protection levels greater than those of up-armored HMMWVs and comparable to those of original MRAP class designs, but in an overall vehicle package that is considerably smaller and lighter than vehicles procured under the U.S. Marines MRAP procurement.

The benefits of the A-kit/B-kit principle are that armor is only fitted when required, reducing vehicle wear and tear and, by default, whole lifecycle costs. Improvements and/or upgrades to armor are also far easier to integrate into an appliqué solution. No quantity for JLTV armoring kits has yet been disclosed, but it is anticipated that the estimated $65,000 kits will be procured on a one kit to three vehicle basis. The overall protection will include a spall liner to minimize perforation effects within a vehicle when the vehicle takes hostile fire.

The JLTV has an automatic fire-extinguishing system to protect the crew cabin. Fuel tanks are mounted externally and shielded by the JLTV structure. Each crew seat has a combined seat and blast restraint device. Ingress time for a crew of four in combat equipment is 30 seconds or less. Egress with B-kit doors is within 10 seconds. The only weight-related data officially released includes a gross vehicle weight of 10,266 lb. Payload for the two-door variant is quoted as 2,318 kg, payload for the four-door variant is quoted as 1,590 kg. The USMC required a vehicle that can be transported by their current and planned systems. In April 2009, Marine Corps Commandant James Conway warned that the Marine Corps "will not buy a vehicle that's 20,000 lb."

The JLTV was to be equipped with a diagnostic monitoring system that will electronically alert the operator of equipment failures so that they can be fixed. The electronic monitoring will observe the fuel, air intake, engine, cooling, transmission, energy storage, power generation and vehicle speed as well as other systems.

Mobility
The Pentagon required at least 600 mean miles before an essential function failure. The vehicle was to be capable of traveling for 3 miles (5 km) cross-country having endured three  perforations of half-full main fuel tanks. When temperatures drop well below zero, the JLTV must start within one minute with no external aids, kits or prior warming of the batteries.

Other tactically driven mobility requirements include a threshold 27-foot turning radius and the ability to climb 24-inch vertical obstacles in forward and reverse. JLTV must be able to drive off an 18-inch vertical step at 15 mph and sustain no mechanical damage. It will be capable of traversing a 20-degree V-ditch that is 25 feet wide at an approach angle of 45-degree. It can 'jump' a 6-inch parallel curb at 15 mph and traverse a 20-foot flight of stairs at 5 mph. It must climb a 60 percent dry, hard-surfaced gradient and traverse a 40 percent sideslope with no degradation in driver control.

JLTV is transportable by sea, rail, and air. The JLTV is transportable on all classes of ocean-going transport ships with minimal disassembly. It was required to be rail-transportable on U.S. and NATO country railways. Air transportability will be by fixed-wing aircraft as large or larger than the C-130 Hercules and sling-loadable with rotary-wing aircraft such as the CH-47/MH-47 and CH-53. The proposed ambulance variant was to be air-droppable by C-5 and C-17 fixed-wing aircraft. The JLTV can be prepared in 30 minutes for transport by aircraft, Maritime Prepositioning Force ships or rail. This is aided by an adjustable-height suspension.

Versions

The JLTV family and its nomenclature evolved throughout the development process and to date the U.S. Army has allocated M designations to four individual JLTV configurations. In JLTV's Initial Capability Document, there were four payload options, this later reduced to three, Payload Categories A, B, and C. By the time Capability Development Document version 3.3 was published at the conclusion of JLTV's Technology Development (TD) phase, payload options had been reduced to only two and payload verbiage had been dropped, replaced by reference to variants. From that point on two stated variants were required, the Combat Tactical Vehicle (CTV) and Combat Support Vehicle (CSV).

The CTV configuration replaced the previous Category A and Category B configurations and was a 4-seat vehicle with a 3,500-pound payload. The CSV replaced the previous Category C configuration and was a 2-seat vehicle with a 5,100-pound payload. The JLTV family now consists of three base vehicle platforms, Utility (JLTV-UTL), Close Combat Weapons Carrier (JLTV-CCWC) and General Purpose (JLTV-GP). The Utility base vehicle platform is a two-door configuration, the General Purpose and Close Combat Weapons Carrier base vehicle platforms are a four-door configuration. Standard U.S. military M-designators are applied base vehicle platforms when outfitted to a specific Mission Package Configuration. These currently are:
 M1278 Heavy Guns Carrier - General Purpose vehicle platform in Heavy Guns Carrier Mission Package Configuration (JLTV-HGC)
 M1279 Utility - Utility (JLTV-UTL) base vehicle platform in Utility Mission Package Configuration
 M1280 General Purpose - General Purpose (JLTV-GP) base vehicle platform in General Purpose Mission Package Configuration
 M1281 Close Combat Weapons Carrier - Close Combat Weapons Carrier (JLTV-CCWC) base vehicle platform in Close Combat Weapons Carrier Mission Package Configuration

There is also a companion trailer (JLTV-T), which is towable by all JLTV variants.

L-ATV specific versions
Oshkosh showcased for the first time the L-ATV Ambulance at the Association of the United States Army (AUSA) Global Force Symposium in Huntsville, Alabama, from 26 to 28 March 2019. The L-ATV Ambulance is based on the utility configuration base platform and the rear can hold 4 litters or up to 8 seated patients or a combination of the two. At present the L-ATV Ambulance is not a JLTV variant, but according to the company the design will be marketed to the U.S. Army and Marines.

Hybrid electric JLTV
In January 2022 Oshkosh unveiled a hybrid-electric Joint Light Tactical Vehicle (eJLTV) technology demonstrator that uses a ‘commercially available' lithium-ion battery. It takes the diesel engine of the JLTV about 30 minutes to charge the lithium-ion battery, and then the eJLTV can operate off of battery power for approximately the same amount of time. It is also able to export up to 115 kW of power. However, the hybrid electric configuration adds more than 453 kg to the vehicle's curb weight.

JLTV-T (T - Trailer)
From June 2019 a dedicated trailer (JLTV-T) is being procured for the JLTV, as in-service trailers were unable to safely match the performance and mobility of the JLTV. A dedicated companion trailer for the JLTV (the JLTV – Trailer (JLTV-T)) formed part of the requirement from its early stages, and the production contract awarded to Oshkosh included the option for trailer production. However, the decision was taken to leverage investment made in the HMMWV’s Light Tactical Trailer (LTT) and not to resource procurement of the JLTV-T. As a result of this, initial quantities were limited to test examples only.
However, operational testing would demonstrate that the LTT was not compatible with a JLTV operating at mission profile speeds, thus the JLTV was limited to the safe towing speed of the LTT to limit equipment damage. In June 2020 Oshkosh announced that the company had been awarded a contract modification to increase available trailer options from 32 to 3,541, and as part of a November 2020 JLTV award 1,001 trailers were ordered. First fielding of the JLTV-Trailer is scheduled for March 2022, and until then the JLTV is used with the LTT, but at a reduced mission profile.

The JLTV-T is based on a bolted channel section chassis and features independent trailing arm and air suspension. Wheels and tires are shared with the JLTV. The cargo deck features removable sidewalls and tailgate, an onboard stowage box included for these when the trailer is used as a flatbed. ISO locks are provided on the loadbed for any required shelter of similar interface.

Operators

Current operators
 : Armed Forces of Montenegro – Montenegro signed a US$36.17 million contract for the procurement of 67 JLTVs, announced on 23 October 2019. The vehicles will equip Montenegro's NATO-declared forces. The first 20 vehicles arrived in 2020, and deliveries will be completed during 2023. Montenegro is to acquire 55 JLTVs in basic configuration, eight in anti-tank configuration, and the remaining four in medical and command configurations.
 : U.S. Army, U.S. Marine Corps and U.S. Air Force – Original contract award on 25 August 2015. Overall requirements have fluctuated, but as of January 2022 were stated by Micheal Sprang, JLTV Project Director to be: Army - 49,099 (this figure has remained relatively constant); Marine Corps - 12,500 (approx.); Air Force - 2000 (dependent on funding); Navy (approx. 400). The initial JLTV contract award had a potential value of US$6.749 billion and called for a maximum of 16,901 JLTVs. The second sole source to Oshkosh contract allows for 6,262 JLTVs to be ordered by November 2023. The JLTV re-compete award will allow for 15,586 JLTV when awarded. Current U.S. Army and Marines orders are for around 19,150 JLTVs.
: Slovenian Ground Force – Signed government-to-government agreement for the procurement of 38 Oshkosh JLTVs in November 2018, with deliveries to take place in 2021–2023. The JLTV order announced in February 2020 included JLTVs for Slovenia but the actual quantity was not disclosed.On 11 May 2021, 38 JLTVs for the Slovenian Army arrived at the port of Luka Koper. They are armed with station M153 Kongsberg.The vehicles were unveiled to the public on June 4th. In June 2021 Slovenia announced it will order another 37 JLTVs during 2021. On 14 September 2021, a contract was signed for an additional 37 JLTVs. In December 2022, another 47 vehicles were ordered, 7 vehicles will be donated by the USA. The Slovenian army will acquire a total of 129 JLTVs.
 : Lithuanian Army - On 21 November 2019, Lithuania and the U.S. signed a contract for 200 vehicles. The first batch of 50 was delivered in August 2021. A contract for another 300 vehicles was signed in October 2022, for a total of 500 vehicles ordered.
 : Brazilian Marine Corps - On 5 October 2020, the Brazilian Marine Corps signed a contract for a batch of 12 JLTVs, to be delivered between 2022 and 2026. In September 2021, it was reported that the Brazilian Marine Corps (CFN) was looking to acquire an additional 48 JLTVs. The 1st, 2nd, and 3rd Marine Infantry Battalions would each receive 12 of the vehicles, while the remaining 12 would go to the Special Operations Battalion. The Brazilian Marine Corps received four JLTVs on 2 March 2023.

Future operators
 : Belgian Army - Belgium's Council of Ministers approved the purchase of 322 JLTVs in September 2020 for EUR135 million. In service the JLTV will replace the Iveco LMV fleet for command and liaison missions, and 20 examples will be configured as ambulances. The contract also includes a multiyear open agreement for technical assistance. First deliveries are anticipated in 2023.
 : The U.S. Army announced a JLTV contract modification in November 2020 that identified North Macedonia as a customer. Oshkosh announced in December 2020 that it had been contracted to produce and deliver 59 JLTVs to Brazil, Lithuania, and North Macedonia, but with no breakdown. Earlier funding statements allowed for equipping the Army of the Republic of North Macedonia with 33 JLTVs, the first delivery of which were expected in late 2021 or early 2022. North Macedonia's Long Term Defence Capability Development Plan predicts the acquisition by 2024 of 96 JLTVs.
 : 26 M1279A1 in both passenger and cargo variants as a part of a sale of 116 M1A1 Abrams tanks.
 : The Romanian Ministry of National Defence (MoND) confirmed in July 2021 that it will acquire more than 100 JLTVs for Romanian special forces under a EUR47 million contract. Oshkosh announced in a press release on 1 July 2021 that Romania was one of the countries for which it had been awarded a USD152 million order for JLTVs.

Potential operators
 - Hellenic Army - In June 27 2022, the Hellenic Army General Staff met with representatives from Elbit Systems after showing interest in the acquisition of SPEAR 120mm mortar systems mounted on the JLTV.

 - Portuguese Army - In April 2020, Portugal announced that it would be seeking to procure the JLTV through the US Foreign Military Sales program. The intention was expressed to Janes by Lieutenant Colonel Ricardo Manuel dos Santos Camilo, head of the capabilities branch of the army general staff's force planning division. In 2019, EUR79 million (US$86 million) was allocated to the revised Portuguese Military Programming Law for the acquisition of JLTVs by 2030 for further army modernisation. However, the total procurement was under review and it was stated that it could change. If purchased, the JLTV would replace the Land Rover Defender series and the Toyota Land Cruiser HZJ73LV vehicles currently used by the Portuguese Army.

: British Army – In June 2016 it was reported that to meet Package 1 of the Multi Role Vehicle-Protected (MRV-P) requirement, the UK Ministry of Defence (MoD) was in talks with the Pentagon on acquiring the JLTV via the Foreign Military Sales (FMS) route. “We can confirm that we are talking to the US DOD regarding Package 1 [of MRV-P], to inform our understanding of an FMS option for the Joint Light Tactical Vehicle,” said an MoD spokesman.  It was stated in January 2017 by Maj. Gen. Robert Talbot Rice, the director of land equipment at the Defence Equipment and Support arm of the Ministry of Defence (MoD), that: "We are working through the Foreign Military Sales process. A letter of request has been sent to our American colleagues, and we expect a response in the next few months." Talbot Rice told an audience of industry executives and military personnel at the International Armoured Vehicles conference in London on 24 January that the Army had opted for the single-source purchase due to its ability to meet UK requirements and its value for money. In July 2017, the DSCA notified the US Congress of a possible sale of 2,747 JLTV vehicles and accessories to the UK. Jane's Defence Weekly reported in September 2019 that approval for the JLTV to enter the demonstration phase was received in April 2019 and that once the demonstration phase was complete in 2021, a new business case would be submitted to the MoD for approval to enter full rate production. The requirement at that time stood at 821 vehicles for the Army and Marines. In June 2022, it was announced that the Package 1 Multi Role Vehicle-Protected (MRV-P) requirement purchase would not move forward; cancellation of the MRV-P Package 1 is not a direct cancellation of the JLTV acquisition, and actually a result of the British Army reviewing its protected mobility needs after the 2021 Integrated Review and associated Command Paper. Delaying any JLTV purchase will also allow the UK to await the outcome of the US Army JLTV recompete process.

Gallery

References

External links

 DSEi 2017: JLTV UK and US update - Sept 2017
 AUSA 2015: Oshkosh Defense on their JLTV program (October 2015 video)
 JLTV on Defense-Update.com
 Oshkosh is JLTV (July 2015 video)
 JLTV Ready (March 2015 video)
 Oshkosh Defense L-ATV page
 Army Joint Light Tactical Vehicle (JLTV) EMD Phase page
 Army Joint Light Tactical Vehicle (JLTV) Low Rate Initial Production (LRIP)/Full Rate Production (FRP) Phase – Final RFP W56HZV-14-R-0039 page
 AUSA 2017: Flexible weapons integration on the Oshkosh JLTV video

Military trucks
Off-road vehicles
All-wheel-drive vehicles
United States Marine Corps projects
Armoured cars of the United States
Military trucks of the United States
Military vehicles introduced in the 2020s
Post–Cold War armored fighting vehicles of the United States